Angelo Tulik (born 2 December 1990 in Moulins) is a French former professional cyclist, who rode professionally between 2012 and 2019, entirely for  and its later iterations. He was named in the start list for the 2015 Tour de France and the 2016 Tour de France.

Major results

2010
 8th Overall Thüringen Rundfahrt der U23
2011
 1st Stage 8 Vuelta Ciclista de Chile
 3rd Paris–Tours Espoirs
 4th Val d'Ille Classic
2012
 1st Stage 4 Rhône-Alpes Isère Tour
 4th Overall Boucles de la Mayenne
1st  Young rider classification
2013
 1st Stage 4 Tour des Fjords
 6th Trofeo Alcúdia
 9th Overall Ronde de l'Oise
 10th La Roue Tourangelle
2014
 1st La Roue Tourangelle
 2nd Tour du Doubs
 10th Overall Tour de l'Eurométropole
2015
 6th Trofeo Laigueglia
2018
 6th Overall Tour de Luxembourg
2019
 4th Road race, National Road Championships

Grand Tour general classification results timeline

References

External links

1990 births
Living people
French male cyclists
Sportspeople from Moulins, Allier
Cyclists from Auvergne-Rhône-Alpes